Forecasting Love and Weather is a 2022 South Korean television series directed by Cha Young-hoon and starring Park Min-young, Song Kang, Yoon Park and Yura. This series depicts a cheerful love story of staff at the Korea Meteorological Administration who break, fall and rise again and their everyday life at work. It premiered on JTBC on February 12, 2022, and aired Saturdays and Sundays at 22:30 (KST) for 16 episodes. It is  available for streaming on Netflix.

Forecasting Love and Weather featured in Global Top 10 weekly list of the most-watched international Netflix TV shows for 6 weeks in a row from February 21 to April 3.

Synopsis
Inside a national weather service, love proves just as difficult to predict as rain or shine for a diligent forecaster and her free-spirited coworker.

Cast and characters

Main
 Park Min-young as Jin Ha-kyung
 Park Seo-kyung as young Jin Ha-kyung
 35 years old, the general forecaster of the 2nd Division of Korea Meteorological Administration (KMA).
 Song Kang as Lee Shi-woo
 27 years old, in-charge of Special Reporting Division 2 of KMA.
 Yoon Park as Han Ki-joon
 36 years old, the informant of KMA's spokesperson's office.
 Yura as Chae Yoo-jin
 25 years old, a weather reporter for a daily newspaper.

Supporting

People at Meteorological Office
 Lee Sung-wook as Eom Dong-han
 44 years old, General 2 department, senior forecaster
 Moon Tae-yu as Shin Seok-ho
 In early 40s, General 2 department, neighborhood forecaster
 Yoon Sa-bong as Oh Myung-joo 
 In mid 40s, General 2 department. Head of Analysis Team 2 of the Korean Meteorological Department. She is the mother of three sons with the highest levels of parenting issues.
 Chae Seo-eun as Kim Soo-jin
 In late 20s, a short-term forecaster became a civil servant with excellent grades.
 Kwon Hae-hyo as Ko Bong-chan
 In late 50s, head of the Forecast Bureau in the Seoul Main Office.
 Bae Myung-jin as Park Joo-moo
 A policy officer who helps Go Bong-chan.
 Lee Tae-gum as local weather forecaster which is a member of the Korea Meteorological Agency.

People around Jin Ha-kyung 
 Kim Mi-kyung as Bae Soo-ja
 In late 60s, Jin Ha-kyung's mother
 Jung Woon-sun as Jin Tae-kyung
 In early 40s, Jin Ha-kyung's older sister, a fairy tale writer.

People outside the Meteorological Office 
 Jang So-yeon as Lee Hyang-rae
 In early 50s, Eom Dong-han's wife.
 Lee Seung-joo as Eom Bomi
 In mid-teens, Eom Dong-han's daughter.
 Jeon Bae-soo as Lee Myung-han, Lee Shi-woo's father

Special appearance
 Seo Jeong-yeon as Seong Mi-jin 
Manager of Jeju Typhoon Center
 Yoon Bok-in as Chae Yoo-jin's mother
 Seo Hyun-chul as Chae Yoo-jin's step father

Episodes

Production
In March 2021, it was reported that Cha Young-hoon will direct the series created by Gline's creative group, led by writer Kang Eun-kyung. During the same time, Park Min-young and Song Kang were considering appearing in the series as main leads. In May 2021, Yura and Yoon Park joined the cast of the series. 

Kim Mi-kyung and Park Min-young are playing mother and daughter on-screen for the fourth time. Before this series, they appeared as mother and daughter in Running, Sungkyunkwan Scandal and Her Private Life. They also appeared together in 2014 KBS TV series Healer.

On October 19, 2021, Park Min-young posted photos from the filming site.

On March 5, 2022, it was confirmed that actor Yoon Park had tested positive for COVID-19 as a precautionary measure. He had a self-diagnosis kit on March 4 and after testing positive. He was given the PCR test immediately as the filming for the drama had ended. The broadcast schedule seems to be uninterrupted.

Original soundtrack

Part 1

Part 2

Part 3

Part 4

Part 5

Part 6

Part 7

Part 8

Part 9

Viewership

References

External links
  
 Forecasting Love and Weather at Daum 
 Forecasting Love and Weather at Naver 
 Forecasting Love and Weather at Npio Entertainment 
 Forecasting Love and Weather at JTBC Studios 
 
 
 

JTBC television dramas
2022 South Korean television series debuts
2022 South Korean television series endings
Television series by JTBC Studios
South Korean romance television series
South Korean workplace television series
Korean-language Netflix exclusive international distribution programming